The current UK Highways Agency CCTV system is called 2nd Generation CCTV. This CCTV system has been produced from a set of specification developed by the Highways Agency, to allow it to effectively monitor traffic on England motorways and trunk roads.  The network currently includes over 1500 cameras operated from 7 regional control centres across England.

History and background
The Highways Agency's original CCTV system or Highways Agency Surveillance CCTV system was used primarily to assist the police with the management of traffic on motorway and trunk roads. It was typically formed out of a number of smaller networks working in isolation.   Each of these small networks consisted of between 10 and 100 cameras that provided images to a single control room and had little provision for third parties. These networks often required a specific manufacturer's camera, restricting the Highways Agency's control over technology and cost.

As the use of CCTV became more important third parties (e.g. fire service, motoring organisations, radio stations) began to require controlled access to road images and the business case for a more nationally controlled network became apparent.  Therefore, to maximise control over its own assets the Highways Agency decided to develop its own CCTV protocols and specifications called 2nd Generation CCTV.

Around the world countries that have mature Intelligent Transport Systems (ITS) for traffic monitoring have implemented similar protocols, such as in the United States with National Transportation Communication for ITS Protocol (NTCIP). However, in countries where traffic monitoring CCTV is in its infancy the use of individual manufacture CCTV protocols (e.g. Pelco D) is more wide spread.

Second-generation CCTV
The second-generation CCTV system uses a range of protocols and standards currently in general use in other CCTV and electrical communication systems. These include CORBA middleware technology to interface between legacy analogue CCTV systems and CCTV components developed by different organisations, and TCP/IP and UDP for network communications.

These cameras have many capabilities:

 Night vision
 Wipers
 Peak white functions
 Iris sensitivity
 Focus sensitivity
 An excellent zoom range

Advantages
The 2nd Generation CCTV system removed the short-comings of the original CCTV system and was designed to meet the Highways Agency's future needs, by:
 Providing national coverage in a single network National Road Telecommunications system
 Improving functionality for control room operators including cross boundary coverage
 Allowing more than one manufacturer camera source
 Providing provision for third party access to the cameras

References

Surveillance
Intelligent transportation systems